Manitoba Water Stewardship was the department of the Government of Manitoba in charge of regulating several aspects of stewardship of water in Manitoba, including water quality, fisheries, and water-use licensing. Today, water stewardship falls under the Conservation and Climate portfolio.

Minister of Water Stewardship 
The Minister of Water Stewardship was the cabinet minister responsible for Manitoba Water Stewardship. The position was created by Premier Gary Doer in 2003 and dissolved during the new premiership of Brian Pallister in 2016.

References

Water_Stewardship
Manitoba
Water in Canada
Manitoba